The 2000 Victorian Football League season was the 119th season of the Australian rules football competition. The premiership was won by the Sandringham Football Club, after defeating North Ballarat by 31 points in the Grand Final on 27 August.

The league underwent significant changes for the 2000 season, being merged with the Australian Football League reserves competition. Since this season, the VFL has served as a state-level senior competition in which reserves players and some reserves teams from the Victorian AFL clubs compete.

Merger with the AFL reserves
The Victorian State Football League had operated two open-age senior competitions during the 1990s: the Victorian Football League, which it took control of in 1995, and the AFL Reserves, which it had operated since 1992. The AFL Reserves competition was contested by the reserves teams of eleven Australian Football League clubs: those of the ten Victorian clubs and that of the Sydney Swans. The VSFL had intended to merge the two into a single competition which would serve as an AFL reserves competition, a state-level senior competition and a development pathway from the 1995 season; however there was such significant opposition from the AFL clubs against abolishing their dedicated reserves competition that they had threatened to use their power to sack the AFL Commission over the changes. Consequently, the two competitions had run in parallel between 1995 and 1999.

Prior to the 1998 season, the AFL again announced plans to amalgamate the VFL and the AFL reserves into a single competition, giving the clubs two years to make arrangements before the combined competition was to begin from the 2000 season. Although most of the AFL clubs were still opposed to the changes, on this occasion they accepted them.

Under the new arrangement, AFL clubs were given two options: they could continue to operate their own reserves teams, fielding them in the VFL; or, they could enter a reserves affiliation with one or more existing VFL clubs. Under the affiliation structure, listed players who were not selected in the senior AFL team would be made available to play for their affiliated VFL club; the VFL club would then make up the balance of the team from its own playing list.

Affiliations and league membership changes
Under the new arrangement, four AFL clubs entered into affiliations with existing VFL clubs. These were:
 affiliated with fellow eastern suburban club Box Hill. Box Hill immediately co-branded with Hawthorn, changing its nickname from the Mustangs to the Hawks.
 affiliated with fellow western suburban clubs Werribee and Williamstown, with half of its players allocated to each VFL club.
 affiliated with Sandringham.
 entered a partial affiliation with Port Melbourne, the club with which it had shared a zone when it was based in South Melbourne. No more than six of Sydney's reserves players played for Port Melbourne; the rest played for a dedicated Sydney reserves team in the Sydney AFL competition.

A fifth affiliation was established with the creation of a new club, the Murray Kangaroos. The Murray Kangaroos was operated in partnership between the North Melbourne Football Club and the Ovens & Murray Football League, and was based at both Coburg City Oval in Melbourne and the Lavington Sports Ground in Albury. The Murray Kangaroos were affiliated with the Murray Bushrangers from the TAC Cup under-18s competition, which served to complete the VSFL's original vision that all twelve Victorian TAC Cup clubs would be affiliated with a VFL club.

This left six Victorian AFL clubs, all of which entered their reserves teams directly into the VFL. These were: Carlton, Collingwood, Essendon, Geelong, Richmond and St Kilda.

Other changes
After four years, the merger between Preston Bullants senior club and the Northern Knights TAC Cup club was terminated, and the two clubs returned to being separate entities. The senior club, which had competed as the Preston Knights since 1996, became known as the Northern Bullants, and it returned to the red and white colours that it had worn prior to 1996.

With the increased size of the league, the finals were expanded from five clubs to eight clubs. The VFL adopted the same final eight system which was adopted by the AFL in the same season, replacing the McIntyre Final Five which had been in use since 1989.

The Victorian State Football League was superseded by a newly established body, Football Victoria, which administered the league.

Summary
As a result of this large suite of changes, the size of the VFL grew from eleven to eighteen clubs, the largest it had been since 1987. The size of the competition during the 2000 season set a new record as the largest to contest the premiership in a single division in VFA/VFL history, a mark which stood until 2021. The clubs were:

Stand alone VFL
Bendigo
Coburg-Fitzroy
Frankston
North Ballarat
Northern Bullants
Springvale

AFL reserves teams
Carlton
Collingwood
Essendon
Geelong
Richmond
St Kilda

AFL reserves affiliated
Box Hill
Murray Kangaroos
Port Melbourne
Sandringham
Werribee
Williamstown

Premiership season

Ladder

Finals Series

Grand Final

Awards
The Jim 'Frosty' Miller Medal was won for the second consecutive year by Nick Sautner (Sandringham), who kicked 60 goals.
The J. J. Liston Trophy was won by David Robbins (Springvale), who polled 23 votes.
The Fothergill-Round Medal was won by Michael Swan (Port Melbourne).
Sandringham won the reserves premiership. Sandringham 17.15 (117) defeated Port Melbourne 11.7 (73) in the Grand Final, held as a curtain-raiser to the Seniors Grand Final on 27 August.

Notable events
The VFL established a second television deal during the 2000 season, with one match played each Monday night and broadcast live on the Seven Network's subscription television channel C7 Sport, in addition to the long-standing weekly Saturday afternoon broadcasts on ABC Victoria. The Monday night fixture was short-lived, and did not survive beyond the 2000 season.
With the disuse of Waverley Park for Australian Football League games following the opening of Docklands Stadium, Waverley Park became available for VFA/VFL football for the first and only time in its history. Springvale, located only a few kilometres away, played all but its first home game of the season at the ground, and all Monday night games were played at the ground, as well as a few other isolated games and the Grand Final. The Grand Final was the last game of competitive football played on Waverley Park before it was sold to developers.
Bendigo's six point win against Murray in Round 17 was its final ever win as a stand-alone VFL club. Its remaining 78 games as a stand-alone club (spanning seasons 2000–2002 and 2013–2014 and excluding the period of its reserves affiliation with ) yielded one draw and 77 losses.
As with other major football leagues, the 2000 season was played a month earlier than usual, to ensure it was finished before the 2000 Sydney Olympics, which began on 15 September.

See also
 List of VFA/VFL premiers
 Australian rules football
 Victorian Football League
 Australian Football League
 2000 AFL season

References

Victorian Football League seasons
VFL